Nickel-62 is an isotope of nickel having 28 protons and 34 neutrons.

It is a stable isotope, with the highest binding energy per nucleon of any known nuclide (8.7945 MeV). It is often stated that 56Fe is the "most stable nucleus", but only because 56Fe has the lowest mass per nucleon (not binding energy per nucleon) of all nuclides. The lower mass per nucleon of 56Fe is possible because 56Fe has 26/56 ≈ 46.43% protons, while 62Ni has only 28/62 ≈ 45.16% protons; and the larger fraction of lighter protons in 56Fe lowers its mean mass-per-nucleon ratio in a way that has no effect on its binding energy.

Properties 

The high binding energy of nickel isotopes in general makes nickel an "end product" of many nuclear reactions (including neutron capture reactions) throughout the universe and accounts for the high relative abundance of nickel—although most of the nickel in space (and thus produced by supernova explosions) is nickel-58 (the most common isotope) and nickel-60 (the second-most), with the other stable isotopes (nickel-61, nickel-62, and nickel-64) being quite rare. This suggests that most nickel is produced in supernovas in the r-process of neutron capture from nickel-56 immediately after the core-collapse, with any nickel-56 that escapes the supernova explosion rapidly decaying to cobalt-56 and then stable iron-56.

Relationship to iron-56 

The second and third most tightly bound nuclei are those of 58Fe and 56Fe, with binding energies per nucleon of 8.7922 MeV and 8.7903 MeV, respectively.

As noted above, the isotope 56Fe has the lowest mass per nucleon of any nuclide, 930.412 MeV/c2, followed by 62Ni with 930.417 MeV/c2 and 60Ni with 930.420 MeV/c2. As noted, this does not contradict binding numbers because 62Ni has a greater proportion of neutrons which are more massive than protons.

If one looks only at the nuclei proper, without including the electron cloud, 56Fe again shows the lowest mass per nucleon (930.175 MeV/c2), followed by 60Ni (930.181 MeV/c2), and 62Ni (930.187 MeV/c2).

The misconception of 56Fe's higher nuclear binding energy probably originated from astrophysics. During nucleosynthesis in stars the competition between photodisintegration and alpha capturing causes more 56Ni to be produced than 62Ni (56Fe is produced later in the star's ejection shell as 56Ni decays). The 56Ni is the natural end product of silicon-burning at the end of a supernova's life and is the product of 14 alpha captures in the alpha process which builds more massive elements in steps of 4 nucleons, from carbon. This alpha process in supernovas burning ends here because of the higher energy of zinc-60, which would be produced in the next step, after addition of another "alpha" (or more properly termed, helium nucleus).

Nonetheless, 28 atoms of nickel-62 fusing into 31 atoms of iron-56 releases  of energy; hence the future of an expanding universe without proton decay includes iron stars rather than "nickel stars".

See also
Isotopes of nickel

References

Isotopes of nickel